.ch is the country code top-level domain (ccTLD) for Switzerland in the Domain Name System of the Internet. Made available in 1987, only two years after .com, it is administered by SWITCH Information Technology Services.

The domain ch, as with other ccTLDs, is based on the ISO 3166-2 code for Switzerland derived from Confoederatio Helvetica (Helvetic Confederation), the Latin name for the country, which was used because of its neutrality with regard to the four official languages of Switzerland.

Second-level domain names must be at least three letters long. Two-letter subdomain names are restricted to the Swiss cantons, as well as the domain ch.ch of the Federal Chancellery of Switzerland. The only exception has been the former domain of the Expo.02 which was held in Switzerland, www.expo.02.ch.

Registrations of internationalized domain names have been accepted since March 2004.

In the Chinese domain market 
.ch has been of a rising interest to Chinese domain investors for several reasons. According to EuropeID.com, the domain .ch still has many valuable English keywords and short letter and number combinations left. A contributing factor may be because the majority of .ch registrations are in German, leaving many English words available. In addition, with 2 million domains under .ch being registered, most of the reserved domains have the European market in mind, allowing valuable domains for other languages such as Chinese keywords in the Latin script being registered at a normal price.

Domain hacks 
The .ch domain is very popular in domain hacks, used to spell words and names that end in "ch": for example, Techcrunch's tcrn.ch. This phenomenon is not limited to English; to take another example, the domain scha.ch (Schach, German for "chess") has been registered.

.swiss 
The Federal Office of Communications (OFCOM) has begun registering .swiss domains as of 7 September 2015. This is meant to augment the traditional .ch TLD. Applicants must currently have a "registered place of business and a physical administrative base in Switzerland" to apply.

References

External links
 IANA .ch whois information
 .ch NIC registry

Country code top-level domains
Communications in Switzerland
Council of European National Top Level Domain Registries members
Computer-related introductions in 1987
Internet in Switzerland
Internet properties established in 1987

sv:Toppdomän#C